Lesley Conroy is an Irish actress, director and screenwriter. She is known for her parts in Fair City and Mattie.

Background
Conroy is a fluent Irish speaker from County Cork. She graduated from University College Cork in 1993 with a BA in English and French. and is a graduate of Trinity College Dublin's Samuel Beckett centre.

Career
In 2008 Conroy featured in Eden.
Conroy came to prominence opposite Pat Shortt in Mattie. She worked with Shortt again in the 2013 feature Life's a Breeze. She joined the cast of Fair City in 2017. She starred in the short film Cleaner which she wrote and directed.

Writing
Conroy won the Scripts Ireland short film script competition in 2020, for Cleaner.

Filmography
My Brother's War - 1997
Saltwater - 2000
 Eden - 2006 Nominated for IFTA Award for Best Supporting Actress
Mattie - 2009 - 2010
Life's a Breeze - 2013
The Cured - 2017
Fair City - 2017 - 2018
Cleaner - 2020

References

External links
 

Irish actresses
Alumni of Trinity College Dublin
Alumni of University College Cork
Living people
Actors from County Cork
Year of birth missing (living people)